The Lim Bo Seng Memorial is an octagonal pagoda-like war memorial at Esplanade Park, Singapore. It was erected in 1954 in honour of the late Lim Bo Seng for his heroic acts and selfless sacrifice during the World War II. The war memorial is the only structure in Singapore that commemorates an individual's efforts in World War II and was gazetted as a national monument on 28 December 2010.

History
In 1946, The Lim Bo Seng Memorial Committee was established to raise funds for the memorial and prepared the proposals of the plan to colonial government, one of which proposed the construction of a memorial park around the late Lim Bo Seng's grave at MacRitchie Reservoir. The colonial government rejected five of the committee's proposals, and would later grant permission in 1953 for a memorial to be built at the Esplanade based on the sixth proposal.

On 3 November 1953 at 5.30 pm, the British Commissioner-General for Southeast Asia Malcolm MacDonald laid the foundation stone for the structure at the ceremony with Lim Bo Seng's widow Gan Choo Neo and her children in present.

Architecture
The bronze roof and the bronze lions are imported from Hong Kong. Four bronze plaques imprinted with inscription account of Lim's life in English, Chinese, Tamil and Jawi, were installed around the memorial.

Unveiling of the Memorial
On 29 June 1954, the completed Memorial was unveiled by Sir Charles Loewen, the Commander-in-Chief of the Far East Land Forces in front of a crowd of people with Lim's widow, her children and some members of the Force 136 in present at the 10th death anniversary ceremony of Major-General Lim Bo Seng.

On 29 June 1959 on the 15th anniversary of the death of Major-General Lim Bo Seng, Lim's widow and her eldest son Lim Leong Geok and daughter Lim Oon Geok among others laid wreaths at the Memorial at Esplanade Park and at his memorial tomb at MacRitchie Reservoir.

National Monument
On 28 December 2010, the Lim Bo Seng Memorial was gazetted by the Preservation of Monuments Board as a National Monument along with The Cenotaph and the Tan Kim Seng Fountain at the Esplanade Park and the Singapore Conference Hall along Shenton Way.

Gallery

References

National monuments of Singapore
Downtown Core (Singapore)
Buildings and structures completed in 1954
Landmarks in Singapore
Monuments and memorials in Singapore
World War II memorials
20th-century architecture in Singapore